The Polyporaceae are a family of poroid fungi belonging to the Basidiomycota.  The flesh of their fruit bodies varies from soft (as in the case of the dryad's saddle illustrated) to very tough.  Most members of this family have their hymenium (fertile layer) in vertical pores on the underside of the caps, but some of them have gills (e.g. Panus) or gill-like structures (such as Daedaleopsis, whose elongated pores form a corky labyrinth).  Many species are brackets, but others have a definite stipe – for example, Polyporus badius.

Most of these fungi have white spore powder but members of the genus Abundisporus have colored spores and produce yellowish spore prints. Cystidia are absent.

Taxonomy
In his 1838 work Epicrisis Systematis Mycologici seu Synopsis Hymenomycetum, Elias Magnus Fries introduced the "Polyporei". August Corda published the name validly the following year, retaining Fries's concept. American mycologist William Alphonso Murrill, in a series of publications in the early 1900s, classified the polypores into a more organized family of 78 genera, including 29 that were monotypic, and 39 that were new to science. Around the same time as Murrill, Curtis Gates Lloyd devoted considerable effort in sorting polypore taxonomy, and amassed a large and diverse collection of fruit bodies from around the world. In his 1953 monograph The Polyporaceae of the European U.S.S.R. and Caucasia, Apollinarii Semenovich Bondartsev included 54 genera in the Polyporaceae, which he further divided into five subfamilies and 10 tribes. Several works contributing to the systematics of the Polyporaceae were published in the following decades, including Marinus Anton Donk (1960, 1964), Gordon Heriot Cunningham (1965), and David Pegler (1973).

Genera

, Index Fungorum accepts 114 genera and 1621 species in the Polyporaceae:
Abundisporus  Ryvarden (1999); 7 species
Amyloporia  Singer (1944); 5 species
Amyloporiella  A.David & Tortič (1984); 1 species
Atroporus Ryvarden (1973); 3 species
Aurantiporus  Murrill (1905); 5 species
Australoporus  P.K.Buchanan & Ryvarden (1988); 1 species
Austrolentinus  Ryvarden (1991); 1 species
Cellulariella Zmitr. & Malysheva (2014); 2 species
Cerrena  Gray (1821); 7 species
Cerarioporia F.Wu, L.W.Zhou & Jing Si; 1 species
Colospora  Miettinen & Spirin (2015); 1 species
Coriolopsis  Murrill (1905); 21 species
Cryptomphalina  R.Heim (1966); 1 species
Cryptoporus  (Peck) Shear (1902); 2 species
Cystidiophorus  Bondartsev & Ljub. (1963); 1 species
Daedaleopsis  J.Schröt. (1888); 9 species
Datronia  Donk (1966); 8 species
Datroniella  B.K.Cui, Hai J.Li & Y.C.Dai (2014); 5 species
Dentocorticium  (Parmasto) M.J.Larsen & Gilb. (1974); 7 species
Dextrinoporus H.S.Yuan (2018); 1 species
Dichomitus  D.A.Reid (1965); 24 species
Diplomitoporus  Domański (1970); 20 species
Earliella  Murrill (1905); 1 species
Echinochaete  D.A.Reid (1963); 5 species
Epithele  (Pat.) Pat. (1900); 24 species
Epithelopsis  Jülich (1976); 2 species
Erastia  Niemelä & Kinnunen (2005); 1 species
Faerberia  Pouzar (1981); 1 species
Favolus  Fr. (1828); 25 species
Flammeopellis  Y.C.Dai, B.K.Cui & C.L.Zhao (2014); 1 species
Fomes  (Fr.) Fr. (1849); 59 species
Funalia  Pat. (1900); 7 species
Fuscocerrena  Ryvarden (1982); 1 species
Globifomes  Murrill (1904); 1 species
Grammothele  Berk. & M.A.Curtis (1868); 19 species
Grammothelopsis  Jülich (1982); 7 species
Hapalopilus  P.Karst. (1881); 15 species
Haploporus  Bondartsev & Singer (1944); 6 species
Hexagonia  Fr. (1836); 41 species
Hymenogramme  Mont. & Berk. (1844); 1 species
Laccocephalum  McAlpine & Tepper (1895); 5 species
Laetifomes  T.Hatt. (2001); 1 species
Leifiporia Y.C.Dai, F.Wu & C.L.Zhao (2016); 2 species
Leiotrametes Welti & Courtec. (2012); 2 species
Lentinus  Fr. (1825); 120 species
Lenzites  Fr. (1836); 25 species
Leptoporus  Quél. (1886); 12 species
Lignosus  Lloyd ex Torrend (1920); 8 species
Lithopolyporales  R.K.Kar, N.Sharma, A.Agarwal & R.Kar (2003); 1 species
Lloydella Bres. (1901); 3 species
Lopharia  Kalchbr. & MacOwan (1881); 15 species
Loweporus  J.E.Wright (1976); 8 species
Macrohyporia  I.Johans. & Ryvarden (1979); 3 species
Megasporia  B.K.Cui, Y.C.Dai & Hai J.Li (2013); 7 species
Megasporoporia  Ryvarden & J.E.Wright (1982); 4 species
Megasporoporiella  B.K.Cui, Y.C.Dai & Hai J.Li (2013); 5 species
Melanoderma B.K.Cui & Y.C.Dai (2011); 2 species
Melanoporella Murrill (1907); 1 species
Microporellus  Murrill (1905); 23 species
Microporus  P.Beauv. (1805); 12 species
Mollicarpus  Ginns (1984); 1 species
Mycobonia  Pat. (1894); 1 species
Myriothele  Nakasone (2013); 1 species
Navisporus  Ryvarden (1980); 6 species
Neodatronia B.K.Cui, Hai J.Li & Y.C.Dai (2014); 2 species
Neodictyopus Palacio, Robledo, Reck & Drechsler-Santos; 3 species
Neofavolus  Sotome & T.Hatt. (2013); 4 species
Neofomitella  Y.C.Dai, Hai J.Li & Vlasák (2015); 3 species
Nigrofomes  Murrill (1904); 2 species
Pachykytospora  Kotl. & Pouzar (1963); 3 species
Panus  Fr. (1838); 40 species
Perenniporia  Murrill (1942); 100 species
Perenniporiella  Decock & Ryvarden (2003); 5 species
Perenniporiopsis C.L.Zhao (2017); 1 species
Phaeotrametes  Lloyd ex J.E.Wright (1966); 1 species
Piloporia  Niemelä (1982); 2 species
Podofomes  Pouzar (1966); 3 species
Polyporus  P.Micheli ex Adans. (1763); 279 species
Porogramme  (Pat.) Pat. (1900); 7 species
Poronidulus  Murrill (1904); 2 species
Pseudofavolus  Pat. (1900); 6 species
Pseudopiptoporus  Ryvarden (1980); 2 species
Pseudomegasporoporia 1 species
Pycnoporus  P.Karst. (1881); 4 species
Pyrofomes  Kotl. & Pouzar (1964); 7 species
Roseofavolus T.Hatt. (2003); 1 species
Royoporus  A.B.De (1996); 2 species
Rubroporus  Log.-Leite, Ryvarden & Groposo (2002); 2 species
Ryvardenia  Rajchenb. (1994); 2 species
Sarcoporia P.Karst. (1894); 3 species
Skeletocutis  Kotl. & Pouzar (1958); 43 species
Sparsitubus  L.W.Hsu & J.D.Zhao (1980); 1 species
Spongipellis  Pat. (1887); 9 species
Stiptophyllum  Ryvarden (1973); 1 species
Thermophymatospora  Udagawa, Awao & Abdullah (1986); 1 species
Tinctoporellus  Ryvarden (1979); 4 species
Trametes  Fr. (1836); 195 species
Trametopsis  Tomšovský (2008); 1 species
Tyromyces  P.Karst. (1881); 119 species
Truncospora  Pilát (1953); 10 species
Vanderbylia  D.A.Reid (1973); 7 species
Wolfiporia  Ryvarden & Gilb. (1984); 6 species
Xerotus  Fr. (1828); 16 species
Yuchengia  B.K.Cui & Steffen (2013); 1 species

In a proposed family-level classification of the Polyporales based on molecular phylogenetics, Alfredo Justo and colleagues propose synonymizing the Ganodermataceae with the Polyporaceae, and accept 44 genera in this family: Abundisporus, Amauroderma, Cerarioporia, Colospora, Cryptoporus, Datronia, Datroniella, Dendrodontia, Dentocorticium, Dichomitus, Donkioporia, Earliella, Echinochaete, Epithele, Favolus, Fomes, Fomitella, Ganoderma, Grammothele, Grammothelopsis, Hexagonia, Haploporus, Hornodermoporus, Lentinus, Lignosus, Lopharia, Megasporia, Megasporoporia, Melanoderma, Microporellus, Microporus, Neodatronia, Neofavolus, Pachykytospora, Perenniporia, Perenniporiella, Pseudofavolus, Pyrofomes, Tinctoporellus, Tomophagus, Trametes, Truncospora, Vanderbylia, and Yuchengia.

References

 
Polyporaceae
Taxa named by Elias Magnus Fries
Taxa described in 1839